The 1964 New Hampshire gubernatorial election was held on November 3, 1964. Incumbent Democrat John W. King defeated Republican nominee John Pillsbury with 66.77% of the vote.

Primary elections
Primary elections were held on September 8, 1964.

Republican primary

Candidates
John Pillsbury
Wesley Powell, former Governor
John C. Mongan, Mayor of Manchester
Albert Levitt
Walter L. Koenig
Elmer E. Bussey

Results

General election

Candidates
John W. King, Democratic
John Pillsbury, Republican

Results

References

1964
New Hampshire
Gubernatorial